"Giving It All Away" is the debut solo single by Roger Daltrey, the lead singer of The Who. The song was written by the then unknown Leo Sayer with David Courtney. Adam Faith and David Courtney  produced the track.
 
The song was the first single from the 1973 album Daltrey. It reached number five in the UK Singles Chart but failed to chart in the US. Daltrey would never beat this chart position in the UK throughout his whole solo career.

The British release, with considerable airplay of "Giving It All Away", (first lines "I paid all my dues so I picked up my shoes, I got up and walked away") coincided with news reports of the Who being sued for unpaid damage to their hotel on a recent tour, including a TV set being thrown out of the window.

Daltrey performed the song on The Old Grey Whistle Test in 1973.

Sayer later recorded his own version of the song for his second studio album Just a Boy (1974), along with another track from Daltrey, "One Man Band".

Daltrey later re-introduced the song into his setlist for his 2022 UK tour.

References

External links

1973 debut singles
Leo Sayer songs
MCA Records singles
Songs written by Leo Sayer
Polydor Records singles
Track Records singles
1973 songs
Songs written by David Courtney